The 1929 Dayton Flyers football team was an American football team that represented the University of Dayton as a member of the Ohio Athletic Conference during the 1929 college football season. In its seventh season under head coach Harry Baujan, the team compiled a 4–5 record.

Schedule

References

Dayton
Dayton Flyers football seasons
Dayton Flyers football